Taragarh Fort is a fortress built upon a steep hillside in the city of Ajmer in the Indian state of Rajasthan. It was constructed in the 8th century by Ajayaraja Chauhan (721–734) and it was originally called Ajaymeru Durg.

History
This fort was known for its strength and strategic importance. First attack on this fort was made by Muhammad of Ghazni in 1024 AD. He laid down the siege, was wounded and failed to take the fort.

Prithviraj, son of Rana Raimal of Mewar and elder brother of Rana Sanga, captured Taragarh fort  of Ajmer during the end of 15th century, after slaying Governor Mallu Khan. The fort is also called Taragarh, named after Prithviraj's wife Tarabai. It remained under control of Mewar and later Rana Sanga granted it to Karamchand Panwar

Architecture
There are three gateways to the fort known as Lakshmi Pol, Phuta Darwaza, and Gagudi ki Phatak. There were 14 bastions in the wall of this fort. 
Most parts of these gateways are now in ruins. The largest of its battlements is the 16th-century bastion known as the Bhim Burj, on which was once mounted a large cannon called Garbh Gunjam, or 'Thunder from the Womb'. In the fort are water reservoirs.

The fort also holds a shrine dedicated to Miran Saheb ki Dargah, who lost his life in 1202 CE during a Rajput attack. He was killed by Rajput bravehearts.

As per Tarikhi Daudi, there was no Dargah when Sher Shah visited the fort in 1544 CE and this place has no importance. It was later made up as Dargah.

References

Further reading

 
 
 
 

Forts in Rajasthan
Rajput architecture
Buildings and structures in Ajmer
Tourist attractions in Ajmer